USS Brewton (FF-1086) is a  of the United States Navy and the first ship of her name. She is currently in service with the Republic of China Navy as the ROCS Fong Yang (FFG-933).

Design and description
The Knox class design was derived from the  modified to extend range and without a long-range missile system. They displaced  at full load. Their crew consisted of 13 officers and 211 enlisted men.

The ships were equipped with one Westinghouse geared steam turbine that drove the single propeller shaft.

The Knox-class ships were armed with a 5"/54 caliber Mark 42 gun forward and a single 3"/50 caliber gun aft. They mounted an eight-round ASROC launcher between the 5-inch (127 mm) gun and the bridge. Close-range anti-submarine defense was provided by two twin  Mk 32 torpedo tubes. The ships were equipped with a torpedo-carrying DASH drone helicopter; its telescoping hangar and landing pad were positioned amidships aft of the mack. Beginning in the 1970s, the DASH was replaced by a SH-2 Seasprite LAMPS I helicopter and the hangar and landing deck were accordingly enlarged. Most ships also had the 3-inch (76 mm) gun replaced by an eight-cell BPDMS missile launcher in the early 1970s.

Construction and career

US service
Brewton was launched 24 July 1971 and commissioned on 8 July 1972 and assigned to Destroyer Squadron 33 at Pearl Harbor.

The body of the Vietnam Unknown Soldier was transported aboard Brewton to Naval Air Station Alameda, California in May 1984. The remains were then sent to Travis Air Force Base, California, 24 May. The Vietnam Unknown arrived at Andrews Air Force Base, Maryland, the next day.

She was decommissioned on 2 July 1992 at Naval Station Pearl Harbor after over 20 years of service, and struck from the Naval Register on 11 January 1995.

Taiwanese service

On 29 September 1999, she was sold to Taiwan under the Security Assistance Program, where she was renamed ROCS Fong Yang (FFG-933). She held a foreign sonar contact for 16 hours off of Taiwan's east coast. She is currently in active service.

Ship awards
 National Defense Service Medal w/ 1 star 
 Southwest Asia Service Medal w/ 1 star
 Navy Sea Service Deployment Ribbon w/ 1 star 
 Humanitarian Service Medal 
 Joint Meritorious Unit Award
 Armed Forces Expeditionary Medal
 Kuwait Liberation Medal (Kuwait)
 Navy Battle "E" Ribbon

See also
USS Joseph Hewes (FF-1078)
USS Kirk

Notes

References

External links

DANFS Brewton
USS Brewton Home Page

 

Ships built in Bridge City, Louisiana
Knox-class frigates
1970 ships
Ships transferred from the United States Navy to the Republic of China Navy
Frigates of the Republic of China
Cold War frigates and destroyer escorts of the United States